Gérard Ouellet (17 February 1913 – 3 April 1975) was a member of the House of Commons of Canada. He was a farmer by career.

Ouellet was born in East Hartford, Connecticut, United States, the son of Emile Ouellet and Celina-Rose Berube. He was first elected as a Social Credit party candidate at the Rimouski riding in the 1963 general election after an earlier unsuccessful attempt to win the riding in the 1962 election. On 23 April 1964, Ouellet left the Social Credit party and joined the Progressive Conservative party for the remainder of his term in the 26th Canadian Parliament. In the 1965 federal election, Ouellet was defeated at Rimouski by Louis Guy Leblanc of the Liberal party.

References

External links
 
 Gérard Ouellet's genealogical profile 

1913 births
1975 deaths
People from East Hartford, Connecticut
American people of French-Canadian descent
Members of the House of Commons of Canada from Quebec
Progressive Conservative Party of Canada MPs
Social Credit Party of Canada MPs